Summer is a 2011 Chilean drama film written and directed by José Luis Torres Leiva.

Cast
 Rosario Bléfari as Isa
 Julieta Figueroa as Julieta
 Francisco Ossa as Francisco

References

External links
 

2011 films
2011 drama films
2010s Spanish-language films
Chilean drama films